A Bé d'interès cultural (BIC) is the Andorran name for a National Heritage Site listed by the Andorran heritage register, Patrimoni Cultural. 

The term literally means "Property of Cultural Interest", although a better translation could be "Heritage of Cultural Interest", as Andorra now protects not only material heritage, like monuments or movable works of art, but also intangible cultural heritage.

Sub-categories 
Non-movable Andorran heritage is divided into the following classifications:
 Monument, which as the term monument implies, refers to buildings or other individual constructions such as public art or memorials that have significant cultural value.
 Conjunt arquitectònic (architectural group or set), grouping of buildings that constitutes a coherent unit, regardless of individual value.
 Paisatge cultural (cultural landscape), joint work of man and nature with aesthetic, historical or cultural value. E.g. Madriu-Perafita-Claror Valley
 Zona arqueològica (archaeological area), area with traces of human intervention in the past.
 Zona paleontològica (paleontological area), area with fossilized remains forming a coherent unit.
Movable heritage, such archaeological objects, bibliographic heritage, and large works of art.

See also
Cultural Heritage of Andorra
 Culture of Andorra
 Cultural Heritage

References

Heritage registers in Andorra
Andorran culture
Law of Andorra